is a district of Nerima, Tokyo, Japan, consisting of 1-chōme to 7-chōme. The district has an area of 2.433 km² as of October 10, 2005, and a population of 32,634 as of March 1, 2007. Its postal code is 178-0063.

Located in the western part of Nerima, Higashiōizumi borders Ōizumimachi, Ōizumigakuenchō and Nishiōizumi on the north, Shakujiidai on the south, Miharadai and Shakujiimachi on the east, and Minamiōizumi on the west.

Ōizumi-gakuen Station is situated in this district, around which a commercial and industrial neighborhood has flourished. On the other hand, Higashiōizumi 3-chōme and other areas nearby are known as well-designed, upper-class residential neighborhoods with a number of large stately homes.

Neighborhoods of Tokyo
Districts of Nerima